Cembalea triloris is a jumping spider that lives in South Africa.

References

Salticidae
Spiders of South Africa
Spiders described in 2011
Taxa named by Wanda Wesołowska